The Ute Indian Tribe of the Uinta and Ouray Reservation is a Federally Recognized Tribe of Indians in northeastern Utah, United States. Three bands of Utes comprise the Ute Indian Tribe: the Whiteriver Band, the Uncompahgre Band and the Uintah Band. The Tribe has a membership of more than three thousand individuals, with over half living on the Uintah and Ouray Indian Reservation. The Ute Indian Tribe operates its own tribal government and oversees approximately 1.3 million acres of trust land which contains significant oil and gas deposits.

Historic bands
The Northern Ute tribe, which was moved to the Uintah Ouray Reservation, is composed of a number of bands. The tribes at the reservation include the following groups:
 Uintah tribe, which is larger than its historical band since the U.S. government classified the following bands as Uintah when they were relocated to the reservation:
 The San Pitch Utes of central Utah lived in the Sanpete Valley, Sevier River Valley, and along the San Pitch River.
 Uintah lived in northeastern Utah from Utah Lake to the Uintah Basin of the Tavaputs Plateau near the Grand-Colorado River-system. 
 The Timpanogos lived in the Wasatch Range around Mount Timpanogos, along the southern and eastern shores of Utah Lake of the Utah Valley, and in Heber Valley, Uinta Basin and Sanpete Valley.
 The Seuvarits band was from the Moab area. 
 White River Utes
 The  Yampa from the Yampa River Valley area and the Parianuche, who lived in the Colorado River valley (previously called the Grand River) of western Colorado and eastern Utah. The two bands are now called the White River Utes. The Sabuagana were of the same relative area as the Parianuche. 
 The Tabeguache, also called the Uncompahgre, lived in the Gunnison and Uncompahgre River valleys of Colorado and Utah.

History
Utes have lived in the Great Basin region for over 10,000 years. From 3000 BCE to around 500 BCE, they lived along the Gila River in Arizona. People of the Fremont culture lived to the north in western Colorado, but when drought struck in the 13th century, they joined the Utes in San Luis Valley, Colorado. Utes were one of the first tribes to obtain horses from escaped Spanish stock.

Spanish explorers traveled through Ute land in 1776. They were followed by an ever-increasing number of non-Natives. The Colorado Gold Rush of the 1850s flooded Ute lands with prospectors. Mormons fought the Utes from the 1840s to 1870s. In the 1860s the US federal government created the Uintah Reservation. Utah Utes, including the Timpanogos or Timpanog tribe from Central Utah, settled there in 1864, and were joined in 1882 by eight bands of Northern Utes.

The US government tried to force the Utes to farm, despite the lack of water and unfavorable growing conditions on their reservation. Irrigation projects of the early 20th century put water in non-tribal hands. Ute children were forced to attend Indian boarding schools in the 1880s and half of the Ute children at the Albuquerque Indian School died.

Government
The Tribal Business Committee is the governing council of the Tribe and is located in Fort Duchesne, Utah.

Reservation
Founded in 1861, it is located in Carbon, Duchesne, Grand, Uintah, Utah, and Wasatch Counties in Utah.

Raising stock and oil and gas leases are important revenue streams for the reservation. The Tribe is a member of the Council of Energy Resource Tribes. The Tribe holds a 5% stake in the proposed Uinta Basin Rail.

Language
The Ute language is a Proto-Numic language within the Uto-Aztecan language family. The language is still widely spoken. In 1984, the tribe declared the Ute language to be the official language of their reservation, and the Ute Language, Culture and Traditions Committee provides language education materials.

Notes

References
 D'Azevedo, Warren L., Volume Editor. Handbook of North American Indians, Volume 11: Great Basin. Washington, DC: Smithsonian Institution, 1986. .
 Pritzker, Barry M. A Native American Encyclopedia: History, Culture, and Peoples. Oxford: Oxford University Press, 2000. .
Ute Indian Tape Recordings Collection; MSS 855; 20th Century Western & Mormon Manuscripts; L. Tom Perry Special Collections, Harold B. Lee Library, Brigham Young University.
The Ute; MSS SC 1162; Newsletters of the Uintah and Ouray Indian Agency (1937-1941); 20th Century Western and Mormon Manuscripts; L. Tom Perry Special Collections, Harold B. Lee Library, Brigham Young University.

External links
 Ute Indian Tribe Website

Ute tribe
American Indian reservations in Utah
Native American tribes in Utah
Federally recognized tribes in the United States
Geography of Carbon County, Utah
Geography of Duchesne County, Utah
Geography of Grand County, Utah
Geography of Uintah County, Utah
Geography of Utah County, Utah
Geography of Wasatch County, Utah